John Alexander Lyons (12 January 1885 – 19 December 1948) was an Australian politician.

Before entering politics he was a wheat farmer and grazier, and chairman of the District Council of Georgetown from 1924 to 1946. In 1926 he was elected to the South Australian House of Assembly as the Liberal member for Stanley, moving to Rocky River following a redistribution in 1938. He held the seat until his death in 1948.

References

1885 births
1948 deaths
Members of the South Australian House of Assembly
Liberal and Country League politicians
20th-century Australian politicians
Mayors of places in South Australia